Medigap (also called Medicare supplement insurance or Medicare supplemental insurance) refers to various private health insurance plans sold to supplement Medicare in the United States. Medigap insurance provides coverage for many of the co-pays and some of the co-insurance related to Medicare-covered hospital, skilled nursing facility, home health care, ambulance, durable medical equipment, and doctor charges. Medigap's name is derived from the notion that it exists to cover the difference or "gap" between the expenses reimbursed to providers by Medicare Parts A and B for services and the total amount allowed to be charged for those services by the United States Centers for Medicare and Medicaid Services (CMS).

Over 14 million Americans had Medicare Supplement insurance in 2018 according to a report by the American Association for Medicare Supplement Insurance.

Eligibility

Medicare eligibility can start for Americans when they turn at least 64 years & nine months old or upon retirement. Those with a disability, End Stage Renal Disease (ESRD), ALS or on Social Security disability for 24 months in a row may also qualify for early Medicare benefits. A person must be enrolled in both Part A and B of Medicare before they can enroll in a Medigap plan. Upon enrollment, Medicare enrollees become eligible for Medigap Open Enrollment. This period starts on the first day of the month one turns 65 & enrolled in Medicare Part B and lasts for six months. During this period, a person can buy any Medigap plan regardless of their health status (called "Guaranteed Issue Rights").

This is different than if someone is losing group coverage or retiring. When this occurs, the person is eligible to exercise his or her "Guarantee Issue" right. With a Medigap guarantee issue right, a person can buy a Medigap Plan A, B, C, F, K, or L that is sold by any insurance company in their state. In addition, the insurance company cannot deny or raise the premium due to past or current health conditions. Also, the insurance company must cover any pre-existing conditions. Instead of exercising the guarantee issue right, a person can opt to go through the underwriting process in order to buy a plan G or N. Once a person is outside their open enrollment period and or guarantee issue, they can change their Medigap plan, but they will be subject to health underwriting by the insurance company they are applying with. Monthly premiums apply, and plans may not be cancelled by the insurer for any reason other than non-payment of premiums/membership dues. Furthermore, a single Medigap plan may cover only one person but may offer spousal discounts. Finally, Medigap insurance is not compatible with a Medicare Advantage plan. You cannot have both a Medicare Supplement and a Medicare Advantage plan at the same time. You can only have a Medigap plan if you are still on Medicare Part A and Part B and have not replaced your coverage with a Medicare Advantage Part C coverage.

Medicare recipients under age 65

Recipients of Social Security Disability Insurance (SSDI) benefits or patients with end-stage renal disease (ESRD) are entitled to Medicare coverage regardless of age, but are not automatically entitled to purchase Medigap policies unless they are at least 65. Under federal law, insurers are not required to sell Medigap policies to people under 65, and even if they do, they may use medical screening. However, a slight majority of states require insurers to offer at least one kind of Medigap policy to at least some Medicare recipients in that age group. Of these states, 25 require that Medigap policies be offered to all Medicare recipients. In California, Massachusetts, and Vermont, Medigap policies are not available to ESRD patients.

Products available
Medigap offerings have been standardized by the Centers for Medicare and Medicaid Services (CMS) into ten different plans, labeled A through N, sold and administered by private companies. Each Medigap plan offers a different combination of benefits. The coverage provided is roughly proportional to the premium paid. However, many older Medigap plans (these 'older' plans are no longer marketed) offering minimal benefits will cost more than current plans offering full benefits. The reason behind this is that older plans have an older average age per person enrolled in the plan, causing more claims within the group and raising the premium for all members within the group. Since Medigap is private insurance and not government sponsored, the rules governing the sale and offerings of a Medigap insurance policy can vary from state to state. Some states such as Massachusetts, Minnesota, and Wisconsin require Medigap insurance to provide additional coverage than what is defined in the standardized Medigap plans.

Some employers may provide Medigap coverage as a benefit to their retirees. While Medigap offerings have been standardized since 1992, some seniors who had Medigap plans prior to 1992 are still on non-standard plans. Those plans are no longer eligible for new policies.

Over the years, new laws have brought many changes to Medigap Policies. For example, marketing for plans E, H, I, and J has been stopped as of May 31, 2010. But, if someone was already covered by plan E, H, I, or J before June 1, 2010, they can keep that plan. Medigap plans M and N took effect on June 1, 2010, bringing the number of offered plans down to ten from twelve.

Congress passed the bill H.R. 2 on April 14, 2015, which eliminates plans that cover the part B deductible for new Medicare beneficiaries starting January 1, 2020. Those who enroll into Medicare after this date will not be able to purchase plans F or C; however, people who enrolled into Medicare prior to then will still be able to purchase plans F or C. Congress believes eliminating first dollar coverage plans will save Medicare money.

In 2020, 58.8 percent of individuals turning 65 and first becoming eligible for Medicare picked Plan G as their Medicare Supplement plan choice. Plan N was the second most-popular choice accounting for 32.8 percent when turning age 65.

Drug coverage
Some Medigap policies sold before January 1, 2006, may include prescription drug coverage, but after that date, no new Medigap policies could be sold with drug coverage. This time frame coincides with the introduction of the Medicare Part D benefit.

Medicare beneficiaries who enroll in a Standalone Part D plan may not retain the drug coverage portion of their Medigap policy. People with Medigap policies that include drug coverage who enrolled in Medicare Part D by May 15, 2006, had a guaranteed right to switch to another Medigap policy that has no prescription drug coverage. Beneficiaries choosing to retain a Medigap policy with drug coverage after that date have no such right; in that case, the opportunity to switch to a Medigap policy without drug coverage is solely at the discretion of the insurance company issuing the replacement policy, but the beneficiary may choose to remove drug coverage from their current Medigap policy and retain all other benefits.

The vast majority of Medicare beneficiaries who hold a Medigap policy with drug coverage and then enroll in a Part D Plan after May 15, 2006, will have to pay a late enrollment penalty. The only exception is for the few beneficiaries holding a Medigap policy with a drug benefit that is considered "creditable coverage" (i.e. that it meets four criteria defined by the Centers for Medicare and Medicaid Services); a Medigap policy with prescription drug coverage bought before mid-1992 may pay out as much as or more than a Medicare Part D plan. Medigap policies sold in Massachusetts, Minnesota, and Wisconsin with prescription coverage may also pay out as much as or more than Part D.

Thus, individuals who qualify for the Qualified Medicare Beneficiary (QMB) program generally also do not need, and should not pay for, Medicare Supplement Insurance. Some employers offer health insurance coverage to their retirees. Retirees who are covered by such group plans may not need to purchase an individual policy. While a retiree may choose to switch to an individual plan, this may not be a good choice because group retiree plans usually do not cost anything to the individual and the group coverage is often as good or better than most individual Medigap policies. Thus, the individual should compare his company's policy costs and coverage with the ten Medigap policies. The retiree should also consider the stability of his company. If it is conceivable that the company will falter, that his costs will rise, or that coverage will diminish, the individual may wish to purchase an independent policy. However, if a new policy is purchased, the old policy must be dropped.

Costs
Costs for Medicare Supplement insurance vary widely.  The 2020 Medigap Price Index found that someone turning 65 could pay more than three times more for virtually identical coverage. Among the top-10 metro areas, the lowest cost for a male age 65 was $109-per-month available in Dallas. The highest cost was $509-per-month in Philadelphia.

See also
Health insurance in the United States

References

External links

Medicare Supplement Overview at Medicare.gov
Benefits Grid for the different Medigap plans at Medicare.gov
 State Health Insurance Assistance Programs (State Assistance) (SHIP)
 Report Medicare Fraud

Medicare and Medicaid (United States)
Health insurance in the United States